Marc Boutruche, (born September 19, 1976 in Lorient, France) is a retired French football defender.

His career began in 1994 with Championnat de France Amateurs side Stade Plabennecois. He stayed there for five years before he moved to Stade Brestois 29 in 1999, where he played for three seasons before joining the then Ligue 2 side FC Lorient in 2002. He retired in 2009.

References

External links

1976 births
Living people
French footballers
Stade Brestois 29 players
FC Lorient players
Ligue 1 players
Ligue 2 players
Stade Plabennécois players
Association football defenders
Sportspeople from Lorient
Footballers from Brittany